Peter Theremin is a Russian composer, performer of the theremin, an electronic musical instrument.

Life and career
Thereminist, the organizer of the festival of theremin culture "Thereminology", creator of the first Russian-language portal about theremin "Theremin Times", the great-grandson of Leon Theremin.
Works with theremin in genres: classical, contemporary improvised music.
Head of Russian Theremin School, the author of a series of lectures on the history of electromusic, on the history of the theremin. The author of the course "Theremin for 24 hours."

CD

 The Owls Are Not What They Seem: David Lynch Tribute Remixes (2017)
 Varvara Vizbor "Forbidden Fruit" (2015) 
 Sergey Babkin "Muzasfera" (2018)
 Panama (Igor Grigoriev) - "Saints" (2018)
 Tatiana Alyoshina "How we flew on a balloon" (2013)

Music for films
Lessons of Auschwitz (dir. Denis Semionov, Webby Award 2020)
The Sheep Islands (2015)
Sounds of Vladivostok (2017) 
Sounds of Vladivostok (theremin party) (2017)[3] (Russia - Cyprus, directed and composed by Marios Elia)
VITEBSK ART SCHOOL for at the Centre Pompidou (Paris) and Jewish Museum, (New York) (2018)
Valse de Vladimir (2018) (France, directed by Matthew Martin)
Lessons of Auschwitz ( 2020) VR film 
"Participation" (2021)
Theremin Party for the VR game M1n0t0r (France-Russia) (2021)

Awards 

 Laureate of the International Film Festival "Fathers and Children" in the nomination "film music" (2017)
 Special grant for teachers from the television contest "Blue Bird"
 Silver medal of the British award Creativepool for music for the film "Lessons of Auschwitz" (2020)
 Bronze of the American Clio Awards (English) rus. 2021 for the music for the film "Lessons of Auschwitz".

See also 
 Electronic musical instrument
 Synthesizer
 Léon Theremin

References

External links
 Official site

1991 births
Living people
Theremin players